The Tău is a left tributary of the river Pogăniș in Romania. It discharges into the Pogăniș near Fârliug.

References

Rivers of Romania
Rivers of Caraș-Severin County